Anthony J. Wood (born 1965) is an English-born American billionaire businessman who is the founder, chairman, and CEO of Roku, Inc.

Personal life
Wood grew up in Manchester, England, and then in Georgia and Texas in the United States. Wood earned a bachelor's degree in electrical engineering from Texas A&M University. Wood met his wife Susan at Texas A&M University, where she studied environmental design. They have three children, and live in Palo Alto, California.

Career
While in college Wood started SunRize Industries which developed software and hardware for the Amiga.  From September 1997 to August 2001, he was president and CEO of ReplayTV, which he sold in 2002 to SONICblue. Wood founded Roku in October 2002, has been the CEO since then, and chairman since February 2008. As of November 2017, Wood owned 27.3% of Roku.

References

Living people
Texas A&M University alumni
American billionaires
American company founders
1960s births
British emigrants to the United States
Businesspeople from Manchester